Porphyromonas uenonis  is a bacterium from the genus of Porphyromonas which has been isolated from a human sacral decubitus ulcer in Los Angeles in the United States.

References 

Bacteroidia
Bacteria described in 2005